Zero Hedge (or ZeroHedge) is a far-right libertarian financial blog and news aggregator. Zero Hedge, per its motto, is bearish in its investment outlook and analysis, often deriving from its adherence to the Austrian School of economics and credit cycles. While often labeled as a financial permabear, Zero Hedge has also been described as a source of "cutting-edge news, rumors and gossip in the financial industry".

Over time, Zero Hedge expanded into non-financial political content, including conspiracy theories and fringe rhetoric advancing radical right, alt-right, and pro-Russia positions. Zero Hedge's non-financial commentary has led to multiple site bans by global social media platforms, although its 2019 Facebook ban and 2020 Twitter ban were later reversed.

Zero Hedge in-house content is posted under the pseudonym "Tyler Durden"; the founder and main editor was identified as Daniel Ivandjiiski.

History and authorship 

Zero Hedge's first post appeared on 9 January 2009 at 4pm, and the domain was registered on 11 January 2009 under the name Krassimir Ivandjiiski of ABC Media Ltd, the father of Daniel Ivandjiiski, who founded Zero Hedge. According to the Boston Business Journal, the website "publishes financial news and opinion, aggregated and original" from a number of writers "who purportedly hail from within the financial industry." Almost all in-house articles are signed under the collective pseudonym, "Tyler Durden", a character in the Chuck Palahniuk book and movie Fight Club.

In September 2009, news reports identified Daniel Ivandjiiski, a Bulgarian-born, U.S.-educated, former hedge-fund trader, who was barred from the securities industry in September 2008 for earning US$780 from an insider trade by FINRA, as the founder of the site, and reported that "Tyler Durden" was a pseudonym for Ivandjiiski. FINRA rulings show Ivandjiiski worked for 3 years at New York investment bank, Jefferies & Co., as well a number of hedge funds, the last of which was Wexford Capital LLC, a fund led by former Goldman Sachs traders.
 One female site contributor, who spoke to New York magazine in an interview arranged by Ivandjiiski, said "up to 40" people could post under the "Tyler Durden" pseudonym. The same New York magazine article, published on 27 September 2009, stated that Ivandjiiski's father was Krassimir Ivandjiiski, a Bulgarian publisher and editor of the pro-Russia right-wing conspiracy theory website Strogo Sekretno ("Top Secret"), and monthly publication Bulgarian Confidential, since 1994.

The domain zerohedge.com is registered in Bulgaria to a company called ABC Media Ltd, managed by Krassimir Ivandjiiski.

In a 29 April 2016 Bloomberg article "Unmasking Zero Hedge", the authors writing as "Tyler Durden" were revealed as Ivandjiiski, then age 37, Tim Backshall, age 45 (a credit derivatives strategist), and Colin Lokey, age 32 (a Seeking Alpha staff writer). Lokey, the newest member, who joined in 2015, publicly revealed himself and the other two, when he left the site in April 2016. Ivandjiiski confirmed the three men "had been the only Tyler Durdens on the payroll" since Lokey joined in 2015. Lokey said he was paid $6,000 per month, and received a bonus of $50,000, earning over $100,000 in 2015. According to Ivandjiiski, the blog generates revenue from online advertising (there is no subscription service).

In March 2020, Bulgarian litigation between Krassimir Ivandjiiski and U.S. journalist Seth Hettena revealed further details about the Ivandjiiski family and the site's ownership.

Site bans

On 12 March 2019, Bloomberg reported that Facebook had banned users from sharing Zero Hedge posts three days earlier. MarketWatch, noting that Zero Hedge is a "frequent critic of Facebook", reported that the ban was lifted later that day with Facebook saying that the ban was a "mistake with our automation to detect spam".  Business Insider, describing Zero Hedge as "a favorite of City and Wall Street traders, known for its anti-establishment and bearish slant on financial topics", noted that Donald Trump Jr. and Nigel Farage raised objections to Facebook's censure of Zero Hedge.

Australian telecom company Telstra temporarily denied access to Zero Hedge and other websites on 20 March 2019 as a result of the Christchurch mosque shootings.

On 20 January 2020, Zero Hedge's Twitter account, which then had 670,000 followers, was "permanently suspended" from Twitter for violating their platform manipulation policy. Bloomberg reported that Zero Hedge had been informed by Twitter that the suspension was as a result of an article titled: "Is This The Man Behind The Global Coronavirus Pandemic?", in which they doxed a Chinese virologist at the Wuhan Institute of Virology. On 12 June 2020, Twitter reinstated the account after an appeal from Zero Hedge and stated that the suspension was an error.

Zero Hedge was banned from the Google Ads platform on 17 June 2020. An email from Google to NBC said that Zero Hedge violated Google's content policy that "explicitly prohibit[s] derogatory content that promotes hatred, intolerance, violence or discrimination based on race from monetizing." The violating comments were found on stories related to George Floyd protests. Google lifted the ban in July 2020, after the management of Zero Hedge began moderating comments.

Zero Hedge revealed on 17 June 2020 that PayPal had, like Google, deplatformed the site, and they would only be able to accept cryptocurrency payments in the future.

Following a community discussion in July 2020, the online encyclopedia Wikipedia ruled that Zero Hedge did not meet the standards for a reliable source as understood by the community and could not be cited as a source for any claims of fact in the encyclopedia.

Manifesto and views

At its creation in January 2009, Zero Hedge published a manifesto on the objectives of the site.

Financial views

The most strongly held belief by Zero Hedge is in Austrian economics, and that economic cycles are really credit cycles, and that the quantitative easing ("QE") by global central banks is a temporary and artificial asset-price support scheme, that makes the credit cycle even more extreme; and hence the site's strongly bearish views. As a result of this view, Zero Hedge supports assets that are outside of the central banking system, including precious metals and gold, and even cryptocurrencies. The site is strongly against Keynesian economics, and sees quantitative easing as a Keynesian "money printing trick", and vilifies advocates of this approach, such as Paul Krugman in particular.  The site praises writers with similar views, such Albert Edwards and John Hussman.

Critics of Zero Hedge label the site a "permabear", whose views missed the global recovery since 2013. Zero Hedge responds that the since 2013, global central banks have undertaken a continuous program of quantitative easing ("QE") (e.g. aggregate monthly easing has rarely dropped below the level of QE1 or QE2, see graphic opposite), and when QE1 and QE2 ended, markets collapsed. The site references Japan, whose market set new lows after each round of QE, from 1994 to 2013, and where the latest round of QE, started in 2013, has seen the BOJ become a dominant owner of the Nikkei 225.

Zero Hedge maintains financial views/theories which are considered conspiratorial, and/or hard-to-prove or unprovable; notable views include:

A connected theme from the above views is that central banks have nationalized capital markets, that prices are artificial and do not reflect economic theory, that U.S. financial institutions have profited from this, and that the manipulation of asset prices has driven wealth inequality in society and built up financial risks (due to the leverage against these prices). Zero Hedge often shows the chart of G3 balance sheets versus Amazon's share price (see graphic), concluding that U.S. taxpayer's money has been used by the U.S. FED to make U.S. taxpayers unemployed.

Bearish macroeconomic views and conspiracy theories aside, Zero Hedge is noted as a source of detailed, but proprietary, research from Wall Street investment banks and institutions, on securities, which can be picked up by the financial media. Sometimes, the research is about other investment banks. It has also been a source of breaking news in the general capital markets industry. In Zero Hedge's early years, it was associated with exposing the unknown world of High-frequency trading ("HFT"), and the HFT techniques that Zero Hedge claimed amounted to market manipulation.

Zero Hedge is known for personalized attacks on specific finance professionals, examples being newsletter writer and commodity analyst Dennis Gartman (over 758 articles), Nobel Prize-winning economist Paul Krugman (over 703 articles), and fund manager Whitney Tilson (over 325 articles), amongst others.

Political views

The 29 April 2016 "Unmasking Zero Hedge" article by Bloomberg quoted former website staffer Colin Lokey as saying: "I can't be a 24-hour cheerleader for Hezbollah, Moscow, Tehran, Beijing, and Trump anymore. It's wrong. Period. I know it gets you views now, but it will kill your brand over the long run. This isn't a revolution. It's a joke."  Lokey told Bloomberg that he was pressured to frame issues in a way he felt was "disingenuous," summarizing its political stances as "Russia=good. Obama=idiot. Bashar al-Assad=benevolent leader. John Kerry=dunce. Vladimir Putin=greatest leader in the history of statecraft." Lokey provided chat transcripts in which Ivandjiiski refers to America's "silent majority" as "beastly", while Backshall acknowledges life in the U.S. is bad "outside of my bubble". Wallace-Wells observed that the site demonstrated a pro-Russia bias, stating the site had a "pointed" Russophilia.

In a series of articles in June–July 2017, the Financial Times, covering an event organised by one of the site's bloggers, said that, "It probably didn't help that Zero Hedge was also used as a lead-in for a 2016 New Yorker piece about the alt-right, despite its financial focus and a political bent that is more Drudge than Richard Spencer."

In January 2020, when the site was removed from Twitter, BuzzFeed News described Zero Hedge as "pro-Trump" and "far-right", while reporting on the removal, The Washington Post said that Zero Hedge "In recent years, the blog has amplified right-wing conspiracy theories on a range of topics".

Alleged Russian Influence
In March 2020, American journalist Seth Hettena wrote an opinion-piece in The New Republic titled "Is Zero Hedge a Russian Trojan Horse?", and provided details on the links between Krassimir Ivandjiiski (the site publisher's Bulgarian father), and Soviet-era activities in propaganda, revealed during litigation initiated by the father against Hettena in the Bulgarian courts. Hettena commented that Zero Hedge has become "a forum for the hateful, conspiracy-driven voices of the angry white men of the alt-right. Racists, anti-Semites, extreme right-wingers, and conspiracy nuts were an underserved audience, and, as it turns out, a profitable one."

In February 2022, intelligence officials from the United States claimed that Zero Hedge has amplified Russian propaganda by publishing articles written by Russian state-run media.

Reception

Launch to 2014
In August 2009, under the pseudonym Tyler Durden, Ivandjiiski was interviewed on Bloomberg Radio on HFT. Following a series of pieces accusing Goldman Sachs of using high-frequency trading to profit via the New York Stock Exchange, Zero Hedge's readership grew rapidly. In September 2009, journalist Joe Hagan wrote that Zero Hedge's founder was "a zealous believer in a sweeping conspiracy that casts the alumni of Goldman Sachs as a powerful cabal at the helm of U.S. policy." In September and October 2009, Financial journalists Felix Salmon and Justin Fox characterized the site as conspiratorial. However, Justin Fox, went on to describe Ivandjiiski as "a wonderfully persistent investigative reporter" and credited him for successfully turning high-frequency trading "into a big political issue," but also termed most of the writing on the website as "half-baked hooey," albeit with some "truth to be gleaned from it."

In his book, Griftopia (2010), Matt Taibbi cited Zero Hedge as having accurately assessed the level of corruption in the banking industry. In January 2011, Zero Hedge was quoted in the Columbia Journalism Review regarding a JPMorgan-Ambac lawsuit: "JPM committed fraud through misrepresentation, then wilfully and maliciously traded against the entities it had sold misrepresented securities to." In March 2011, Time magazine ranked Zero Hedge as 9th, in its 25 Best Financial Blogs, with nominator, Bloombergs Paul Kedrosky, stating that "So while I don't read Zero Hedge regularly—it's too bearish, too conspiratorial and too much of an intellectual monoculture—I like knowing that it exists. Any time I'm feeling like things might just turn out O.K. on planet Economic Earth, I know where to turn to be disabused of that stupid idea." Susanne Craig of The New York Times described Zero Hedge in October 2011 as "a well-read and controversial financial blog."

In December 2012, Bank of America, which had been criticized by the site in the past, blocked its employees' access to Zero Hedge from BOA servers.

2014 to 2018
In September 2014, the site was described by CNN Money as offering a "deeply conspiratorial, anti-establishment and pessimistic view of the world."

In November 2014, Dr. Craig Pirrong, Professor of Finance at the University of Houston, stated: "I have frequently written that Zero Hedge has the MO of a Soviet agitprop operation, that it reliably peddles Russian propaganda: my first post on this, almost exactly three years ago, noted the parallels between Zero Hedge and Russia Today." In December 2013, Zero Hedge accused Dr. Pirrong of being a "paid-for-Professor", who had "made a living of collecting "expert academic" fees by simply signing off on [wall street] memoranda", quoting a New York Times expose by David Kocieniewski into Dr. Pirrong.

In September 2015, Nobel Prize-winning economist and The New York Times columnist Paul Krugman described Zero Hedge as a scaremongering outlet that promotes fears of hyperinflation and an "obviously ridiculous" form of "monetary permahawkery." In November 2012, Krugman had noted that Bill McBride of Calculated Risk, an economics blog, has treated Zero Hedge with "appropriate contempt". Krugman has been one of the most vilified individuals on Zero Hedge, and the subject of over 703 articles (almost all negative) since inception, due to Krugman's advocacy of Keynesian economics.

In April 2016, as part of its expose from the Colin Lokey interview, Unmasking the Men Behind Zero Hedge, Wall Street's Renegade Blog, Bloomberg Markets stated that since its founding in the middle of the financial crisis, "Zero Hedge has grown from a blog to an Internet powerhouse. Often distrustful of the 'establishment' and almost always bearish, it's known for a pessimistic worldview. Posts entitled 'Stocks Are in a Far More Precarious State Than Was Ever Truly Believed Possible' and 'America's Entitled (And Doomed) Upper Middle Class' are not uncommon."

In a May 2016 follow-up Bloomberg opinion piece, Noah Smith said: "Zero Hedge has become known as a source of cutting-edge news, rumors and gossip about the financial industry, as well as a haven for gold bugs, foes of the Federal Reserve and critics of high-frequency trading"; and also that: "But I've realized that the website is also something else—a kind of support group for financial industry workers who are worried about their own economic future in the face of sweeping changes in technology, regulation and demand".

Post–2018

On 20 November 2019, NBC News reported Zero Hedge as the initial source of a "misleading claim about the head of the Ukrainian energy company at the heart of the House impeachment inquiry", which went viral during the impeachment hearings.  NBC said that "ZeroHedge apparently misconstrued the original Russian article from the Interfax-Ukraine News Agency, which did not mention an indictment. The Interfax-Ukraine News Agency operates as part of Interfax, a Russian news outlet".

In January 2020, after Zero Hedge had been removed from Twitter, Business Insider reported that "In the years after the financial crash, the site had a bonafide social presence and a solidified place among financial insiders", and that "Since its rise to popularity among Wall Street insiders, Zero Hedge has since become known for sensationalist headlines and gruff take on the world's news". Reporting on the affair, The Washington Post said that, "Zero Hedge launched in 2009, mostly featuring news and commentary about financial markets from a libertarian perspective. In recent years, the blog has amplified right-wing conspiracy theories on a range of topics".

Litigation

GEROVA Financial
On 27 March 2012, Daniel Ivandjiiski was named as a co-conspirator in a civil complaint regarding a "complaint for damages and equitable relief". The complainant, Noble Investments, who described themselves as a seed-investor in GEROVA Financial Group (NYSE: GFC), alleged that Dalrymple Finance had, with Zero Hedge and others, engaged in a short and distort stock manipulation scheme, by publishing negative reports on GEROVA in January 2011. The complaint stated that, amongst other charges, the defendants made damaging accusations that major shareholders, the Galanis family, and GEROVA senior executives, were involved in a "pump and dump" scheme; it also made ad hominem attacks on both Daniel Ivandjiiski, and his then alleged father, Krassimir Ivandjiiski.

Dalrymple replied: "Writing research on quoted companies and distributing that research to financial media outlets, is neither illegal and is a daily legitimate activity on Wall Street". The complaint did not progress and there was no SEC investigation. GEROVA Financial's share collapsed in 2011, and never recovered. On 24 September 2015, the SEC charged a number of senior GEROVA executives and a few major investors in GEROVA with a "stock fraud scheme", for which several, including the former company chairman and president, Gary Hirst, received jail sentences in 2017.

See also
 Krassimir Ivandjiiski
 Daniel Ivandjiiski
 Marc Faber
 John Hussman

Notes

References

External links
 

2009 establishments in New York (state)
Anonymous bloggers
American financial news websites
American political websites
Conspiracist media
Internet properties established in 2009
Russophilia
Libertarianism in the United States
Alt-right websites
Websites with far-right material